The Lada / VAZ-2105, 2104 and 2107, collectively marketed as Lada Riva for right-hand drive models (in the United Kingdom, Australia and New Zealand), the Lada Nova in Germany, and by multiple other names and markets, are a series of compact sedans of the Zhiguli line-up (Fiat 124-based cars), built by Russian car manufacturer AvtoVAZ (formerly VAZ). Introduced in 1979 in the Soviet Union, and progressively introduced to Western European and global markets from the early 1980s, under the Lada brand, they were sold as saloons (2105 and 2107), and station wagon (2104) versions.

Today they are generally referred to as the Lada Classic series, being derived from the original Fiat 124 platform which has been the now-iconic mainstay of the AvtoVAZ lineup since the company's foundation in the late 1960s. Russian production at the company's main plant at Togliatti ended in September 2012.

Along with the other Fiat 124 derivatives, it is the world's third best selling, single generation automobile platform, after the Volkswagen Beetle and the Ford Model T, and one of the longest production run platforms alongside the Volkswagen Beetle, the Hindustan Ambassador, the Volkswagen (Type 2) Bus, and the Toyota 70 Series.

History

Although introduced in 1979 and first produced in quantity in 1980, the Riva's origins are older: it is a modernised and restyled version of the original Lada type VAZ-2101 Zhiguli saloon, which was introduced in 1970 as a modified license copy of the Fiat 124. VAZ began development work on the facelift version as early as 1975, and the first prototypes were built in 1977, although it would not be until 1983 – three years after its release in the Soviet Union – that the car was made available in Western European markets.

The Riva itself is officially designated – and known in the home market – as VAZ-2105 (base saloon [sedan]), VAZ-2104 (station wagon), and VAZ-2107 (deluxe saloon identified by the large chromed grille). In Russia, VAZ-2105, VAZ-2104, and VAZ-2107 are considered to be different cars rather than variants but nonetheless all of them are part of a single "Klassika" ("Classic") family along with older models such as the VAZ-2101. They are popularly known as Pyatyorka ("the five"), Chetvyorka ("the four") and Semyorka ("the seven").  

Mechanically, the car is virtually identical to the first-generation VAZ-2101, featuring the Fiat-derived manual transmissions, coil spring suspension all round, and aluminium alloy drum brakes with cast iron brake shoes on the rear wheels. The smaller-engined variant, the   version (VAZ-2105) had a revamp of its inline four-cylinder compared to the original VAZ-2101 (Lada 1200). The old OHC design had its camshaft driven by chain, while the new one had a toothed belt drive. Some modifications of the Riva's larger-engined version (VAZ-2107) carried on with the  chain-driven OHC engine coming over from the original Lada 1500 (VAZ-2103), while others had a later  1,6L VAZ-2106/21067 engine. Another change was made to the engine in 1992, when single point fuel injection and catalytic converters were specified to keep up with emissions legislation.

(The 21079 was a Wankel engined version.)

Export sales proved to be very good in Eastern Europe. In the West, Rivas had limited presence in such countries as the United Kingdom, the Netherlands, New Zealand (where it served as a taxi), and Canada. In Finland, they had much larger sales due to the fact that Finland had closer economic ties with the Soviet Union. Canada was the only market to offer whitewall tires. Canadian 2107s were "briefly sold as the Dennis Signet", after the importer, Peter Dennis Motor Corporation. Canadian sales, along with several European markets, ended on 4 July 1997.

Tightening safety and emissions legislation combined with the economic instability in the former Soviet Union during the 1990s led to the Riva being withdrawn from most Western European markets by 1997, although it remained in production at the AvtoVAZ factory in the Russian Federation and was sold as the Lada Classic. It was one of the cheapest automobiles available in the Russian market and remains the most popular second-hand car in Russia even after its production ceased.

In 2002, production of the wagon model was taken over by Izh, before assembly was also started at the Bogdan Group's LuAZ plant, and later in Cherkasy, Ukraine. The 2107 model was produced also at the ZAZ factory in Ukraine and at Suzuki's factory in Egypt. In August 2011, Russian production of the 2107 was moved to Izh. After about thirty years of production, the 2105 was discontinued in 2010, followed by the 2104 and 2107 in 2012.

United Kingdom
British sales were based heavily on low sales price and durability. In 1986, 20,000 Ladas were sold in Britain, 30,000 in 1988. British imports of the older VAZ-2101/2102/2106 ended soon after the Riva's introduction, although they remained available in the Soviet Union and much of the old Eastern Bloc for several years afterwards.

In a review of the new economy car, the British automobile magazine Autocar noted its low price of only £3,158 (£10,736.82 in 2020), improved road performance and an "impressive list of standard equipment", which included "height-adjustable headlamps, internally adjustable driver's door mirror, velour-covered seats, heated rear window, illumination lights for bonnet and boot", and a 21-piece toolkit. However, its spartan interiors and aging design meant that it was never aimed at buyers of market leaders' similar-sized but more expensive products, such as the Ford Sierra, Vauxhall Cavalier and Austin Montego. Nonetheless, the Riva was still selling well in the United Kingdom and many other Western markets in the early 1990s, but the next few years saw a raft of new models come from budget competitors such as Daewoo, Hyundai, Kia and Proton, pushing Riva sales into terminal decline. This, combined with the economic hardships and much-needed investment to adapt cars to stricter European Union emissions requirements not being available, resulted in the decision to withdraw Lada from the UK (and some other European markets) and Canada on 4 July 1997. They had cheaply tried to produce catalytic converter equipped cars (EU mandated from 1992) using carburettors, when all other car makers changed to fuel injection to more accurately control fuel/air ratios. However the catalysts were quickly destroyed as a result and most cars failed their first MOT test (at three years old) as a result.

Despite Lada's withdrawal in 1997 from the British market, most of the surviving Rivas on UK roads were not scrapped; rather the vast majority were re-exported back to Russia due to a shortage of used examples in their homeland and the export specification was considered superior to those that were available domestically.  Even in 2021, many ex-UK right hand drive Rivas are still operating in Russia and the former Soviet states.

New Zealand
The car was also sold in New Zealand, where it was distributed by the New Zealand Dairy Board. The Dairy Board received the cars in lieu of cash payments for deliveries of mutton and butter to the Soviet Union. The last such trade was carried out in 1990.

Models

2104

Estate edition
VAZ-2104 – VAZ-2105 engine, a  carburetor, 4-speed transmission (CAT), the base model
VAZ-21041 – engine VAZ-2101, 4-carb item. PPC. Not commercially produced.
VAZ-21042 – engine VAZ-2103, right hand drive.
VAZ-21043 – engine VAZ-2103,  carburetor with a 4- or 5-speed. CAT, in versions with electrical equipment and interior of the VAZ-2107.
VAZ-21044 – engine VAZ-2107, single injection, 5-speed. CAT, export model.
VAZ-21045 – engine VAZ-2107, single injection, 5-speed. CAT, export model. Not commercially produced.
VAZ-21045D – VAZ-341 engine, diesel, 5-speed. PPC.
VAZ-21047 – engine VAZ-2103, carb, 5-speed. CAT, an improved version with the interior of the VAZ-2104/7. Export modifications were equipped with the radiator grille of the VAZ-2107.
VAZ-21048 – engine VAZ-343, diesel, 5-speed. PPC.
VAZ-21041i – engine VAZ-21067  injector, 5-speed gearbox, with the same interior and electrics as the VAZ-2107, the front seats of the IL-2126.
VAZ-21041 VF – radiator design VAZ-2107, VAZ-2103 engine of  injector, 5-speed gearbox, interior and electrical VAZ-2107 car, the front seats of the Izh-2126.

Pickup Edition
VAZ-21043-33 Pikap – 1.5-litre with 52 kW, produced from 1991 to 2012 at PSA VIS-Avto.

2105

Lada 2105 – with the carb. engine VAZ-2105 and 4-speed. CAT;
Lada 2105 b – the engine VAZ-2103 (distributed injection, the Euro-2) and 5-speed. CAT;
Lada 21050 – with the engine VAZ-2105 and 5-speed. CAT;
Lada 21051 – with carb. engine VAZ-2101 and 4-speed. CAT;
Lada 21053 – with carb. engine VAZ-2103 and 4 of Art. CAT;
Lada 21053-20 – the engine VAZ-2104 (distributed injection, the Euro-2) and 5-speed. CAT;
Lada 21054 – small series, especially for the traffic police, the Interior Ministry and the FSB. Carburetted VAZ-2106 engine, equipped with an additional fuel tank and battery.
Lada 21054-30 – the engine VAZ-21067 (distributed injection, the Euro-3) and 5-speed. CAT;
Lada 21055 – small scale modification for the cab with a diesel engine VAZ (BTM) – 341 production Barnaultransmash;
Lada 21057 (Lada Riva) – Export version of VAZ-21053 with right-hand drive and a single injection engine (Euro-1) was produced in 1992–1997 for the markets of the UK and countries with left-hand traffic;
Lada 21058 (Lada Riva) – Export version of VAZ-21050 with right-hand drive, produced in 1982–1994 for the markets of the UK and countries with left-hand traffic;
Lada 21059 – Debut 1980 as a small scale spetsmodifikatsiya for the traffic police, the Interior Ministry and the KGB with   two-rotor  VAZ-411M or (slightly larger displacement)  VAZ-4132 Wankel engine (which both featured a 9.4:1 compression ratio) and four-speed manual transmission. Priced at 52,000 rubles.
VIS – 2345 – pick poluramnoy design based on VAZ-21053 and 21054, produced by JSC VAZInterService with 1995 by 2006;
Lada 2105 VFTS (Lada VFTS) – a sports car, which was being built at the facilities of the Vilnius factory vehicles under the guidance of the legendary Soviet rallista Stasys Brundza. Homologated to FISA Group B standard. Markets forced engine VAZ-2106, using carburetors WEBER 45 DCOE (  at 7000 rpm  at 5500 rpm) and a spur 4 and 5-speed gearbox, with claw couplings include; since 1986 in order to reduce weight, the car was equipped with doors made of aluminum.
Lada 2105 VIHUR – rally car produced industrial association for the production of sports equipment "Vihur" CC DOSAAF in Tallinn. Homologated for Group A-2/1 union classification (the so-called "queen-group"). According to the requirements of the A-2/1, the engines were serially unchanged.

2107

Lada 2107 (engine 2103, 4 cyl., Carburetor)
Lada 21071 (engine 2105, 4 cyl., Carburetor, timing belt)
Lada 21072 ( engine, Grade 8., Single injection – export version for the European market)
Lada 21073 (engine 2106, 4 cyl., Carburetor)
Lada 21076-20 (engine 2104, 4 cyl., Point Injection)
Lada 2107–71 ( engine,  engine 21034 for gasoline A-76, version for China)
Lada 21074-20 (21067-10 engine, 4 cyl., Distributed injection, Euro-2)
Lada 21074-30 (21067-20 engine, 4 cyl., Distributed injection, Euro-3)
Lada 21077 (engine 2105, 4 cyl., Carburetor, timing belt – export UK version)
Lada 21078 (engine 2106, 4 cyl., Carburetor – export UK version)
Lada 21079 Debut 1982, fitted with  two-rotor  VAZ-411M or (slightly larger displacement)  VAZ-4132 Wankel engine (which both featured a 9.4:1 compression ratio) and five-speed manual transmission. Priced at 58,000 rubles. Originally created for the needs of federal agencies: the traffic police, the Interior Ministry and KGB.
Lada 2107 ZNG (21213 engine, 4 cyl., Point Injection)

Other variants
Model variants included the Riva Signet, Riva 1200, Riva 1300, Riva 1500, and Riva 1600, with trim levels "E" and "L". A Turbo charged model Lada 2107 Turbo was sold in Finland, this version was made by Finnish Lada importer.

Small numbers of Lada rally cars were built with  Wankel engines, fitted with a pair of Weber DCOE twin-choke carburettors.

Production at Suzuki Egypt
In Egypt, the Amal Foreign Trade Company and Lada's parent company AvtoVAZ signed a joint venture agreement to assemble Ladas for the North African market in 2000. However, as they did not have their own factory, space was found at a local Suzuki plant in Cairo to assemble the 2107 version of the Riva. As of 2006, production continued at Suzuki until 2015 with an additional model, the 2110, being produced.

Safety
In the early 1980s, when it was put into production, the car complied with UNECE car safety standards and GOST technical standards.

In 2001, the 2107 version of the Riva scored 0 points out of 16 in a frontal crash test conducted by the modern Russian ARCAP safety assessment program, and was awarded zero stars out of four. The reviewers noted that the result of the test was easily predictable and couldn't be positive, as they were dealing with an old car having an outdated construction of the body and designed at the time when safety tests were different from those of 2001.

In 2002 Za Rulyom magazine performed crash tests on two Lada 21053 models, a new car from 2002 and a used one from 1994. The magazine's experts noted that the newer model complied with UNECE car safety standards 12-03 and 33, but the older and used one failed the latter standard. The story also expressed doubt that the 2002 model could meet the stricter safety requirements that would be imposed in October of the same year.

End of production
In the 2010s, the sales of the Lada Classics remained strong in the car's native Russia and some of the former Eastern Bloc nations. However, production of the 2105 ceased at AvtoVAZ's Togliatti plant at the end of 2010 after a 30-year production run and nearly 3,000,000 units, with production of the other variants being fully moved to the IzhAvto plant near Izhevsk.

The 2107 made the transition to the IzhAvto plant in August 2011, thus marking the end of production of the original Fiat 124 derived models at Togliatti after a 41-year production run and over 14 million units.

In September 2012, the history of the sedan model in Russia was over, when the last 2104 came off the IzhAvto assembly lines. The last unit of the Lada Classic series, a 2104 model, was produced by IzhAvto on 17 September 2012. Starting from the same month, production at the Izhevsk factory was replaced with the Lada Granta. However, the 2107 model was still in production in Egypt.

References

External links

Lada and Fiat model (Russian)
Lada Cars reviews, images, infos (English)

Cars of Russia
Compact cars
Riva
Station wagons
Sedans
Soviet automobiles
1980s cars
1990s cars
2000s cars
2010s cars
2020s cars
Cars introduced in 1980
Rear-wheel-drive vehicles
ARCAP small family cars
Cars discontinued in 2012